USS Manhattan may refer to the following ships of the United States Navy:

 was acquired by the Union Navy during the American Civil War and served until March 1902.
 was a large harbor tug serving from 1965 to 2004. Reclassified 2008 as unnamed YT-800.

See also
Manhattan (Cutter No 30) was built in Panama in 1918 for use by the U.S. Coast Guard.

United States Navy ship names
New York City-related lists